Science Hill is a mountain in the Southern Tier of New York. It is located west-southwest of Limestone in Cattaraugus County. In 1932, a  steel fire lookout tower was built on the mountain. In 1978, it was taken down and reassembled at the Ellicottville BOCES school.

History
In 1928, the Conservation Department's Division of State Parks built a  Aermotor LS40 steel fire lookout tower on Mount Irvine. In 1932, the steel fire lookout tower that was on Mount Irvine was moved to Science Hill. It remained on Science Hill until 1978, when it was taken down and reassembled at the Ellicottville BOCES school.

References

Mountains of Cattaraugus County, New York
Mountains of New York (state)